Minda may refer to:

Minzu University of China, Beijing, People's Republic of China; in Chinese as 民大 (Míndà)
A character in Filipino soap opera Bituing Walang Ningning
A detention facility in Lidcombe, New South Wales
A neighbourhood in Reșița, Romania
An uncommon short form of the female given name Melinda
Minda Inc, an organisation that runs a facility in Adelaide, South Australia, for children and adults with intellectual disabilities 
Minda (village), a village in India
Mindanao Development Authority (MinDA)

See also
Midna, a Legend of Zelda character